Harold Stephens may refer to:

 Harold Stephens (author) (born 1926), American author 
 Harold Montelle Stephens (1886–1955), United States federal judge
 Harold Stephens (American football) (born 1938), American football player

See also
Harold A. Stevens, judge
Harry Stephens (disambiguation)